Brent Munger Brennan (born March 20, 1973) is an American football coach.  He is the head football coach at San Jose State University.

Early life and education
Brennan was born and raised in Redwood City, California and attended Saint Francis High School in Mountain View, graduating in 1991. Brennan later went to UCLA. He lettered in football in 1993 (jersey number 14) and 1994 (jersey number 86) as a wide receiver and graduated in 1996.

Coaching career
Brennan began his coaching career at Woodside High School in Woodside, California as an assistant in 1996. After two seasons at Woodside, Brennan enrolled in graduate school at the University of Hawaii at Manoa and served as a graduate assistant on the Hawaii Rainbow Warriors football team in 1998. Brennan also had stints as a graduate assistant at Washington under Rick Neuheisel in 1999 and Arizona in 2000 under Dick Tomey.

From 2001 to 2004, Brennan was wide receivers coach at Cal Poly under Rich Ellerson. Brennan also became recruiting coordinator in 2004. Cal Poly moved from independence to the Great West Football Conference in 2004 and won the conference championship in its inaugural season there.

Reuniting with Tomey, Brennan became an assistant coach at San Jose State in 2005 and would coach in various capacities for six seasons, encompassing Tomey's entire tenure and Mike MacIntyre's first season. Also a recruiting coordinator, Brennan coached wide receivers in 2005 and 2006, during which he coached future NFL draft picks James Jones and John Broussard and helped San Jose State win its first bowl since 1990 in the 2006 New Mexico Bowl. Brennan coached tight ends while still being recruiting coordinator in the 2007 and 2008 seasons. In 2009, Brennan became co-offensive coordinator and special teams coordinator, while coaching offensive tackles and tight ends as well. When MacIntyre became head coach in 2010, Brennan only coached wide receivers.

From 2011 to 2016, Brennan coached wide receivers at Oregon State, more specifically outside receivers in his final season. Among the players that Brennan coached at Oregon State were the school's all-time leading receiver James Rodgers, and All-American receivers Brandin Cooks and Markus Wheaton; Cooks also won the Fred Biletnikoff Award in 2013.

San Jose State
Brennan was hired as San Jose State's head coach on December 7, 2016. His first two seasons ended with a combined 3–22 record, including a 1–11 season in 2018 that tied the 2010 team for the fewest in program history. Despite the poor record, five of the 2018 team's losses were by fewer than nine points, with three being determined by a field goal.

In 2019, the Spartans began 2–1, and a victory over Arkansas marked the team's first win against a Southeastern Conference opponent. San Jose State also defeated Army, becoming the 20th program all time to beat all three FBS United States service academies (Army, Air Force, and Navy), and rival Fresno State in a comeback. The Spartans finished 5–7, falling one win short of bowl eligibility. Brennan received a three-year contract extension at the end of the season.

The 2020 Spartans went 6–0 in the regular season despite having two games canceled and their final two home games relocated due to the COVID-19 pandemic; the pandemic had also forced the team to conduct preseason practices at Humboldt State University due to Santa Clara County restrictions. San Jose State's undefeated record qualified them for the Mountain West Conference Football Championship Game, where they defeated Boise State for the first time 34–20; it was the Spartans' first undisputed conference championship since 1990 and their first 7–0 record since 1939. Brennan was named the Mountain West Coach of the Year for his team's successes, which included being ranked in the AP Poll for the first time since 2012 and a debut appearance in the College Football Playoff rankings, and also finished fifth in the Associated Press College Football Coach of the Year Award voting with three first-place votes. He signed a contract extension on December 23.

Personal life
Brennan's father Steve played for San Jose State in 1967 while his mother Beth was a cheerleader at the university. He was a first cousin of former Hawaii quarterback Colt Brennan.

He and his wife Courtney have two daughters and a son.

Head coaching record

References

External links
 San Jose State profile

1973 births
Living people
American football wide receivers
UCLA Bruins football players
Hawaii Rainbow Warriors football coaches
Washington Huskies football coaches
Arizona Wildcats football coaches
Cal Poly Mustangs football coaches
San Jose State Spartans football coaches
Oregon State Beavers football coaches
University of Hawaiʻi at Mānoa alumni
University of Washington alumni
High school football coaches in California
Coaches of American football from California